The Rev. Patrick Dillon, C.S.C. (January 1, 1832 – November 15, 1868) was an Irish-American Catholic priest, and second President of the University of Notre Dame from 1865 to 1866. He was the first Irish priest of the University.

President of the University of Notre Dame 
The Rev. Patrick Dillon served as the second president of the University of Notre Dame from 1865 to 1866. He succeeded Fr. Edward Sorin when Sorin decided to focus on his job as Provincial of the Congregation. His brief tenure featured the construction of the second main building. Dillon instituted the Commercial Course, which offered students the opportunity to study bookkeeping and
commercial law. He also laid the foundations for the development of a course in the sciences. He was popular with students because of his disciplinary leniency.

He died of illness a few years later in 1868.

Dillon Hall at the University of Notre Dame was dedicated in 1931 in his honor.

References

External links

19th-century Irish people
1832 births
1868 deaths
People from County Galway
Presidents of the University of Notre Dame
Congregation of Holy Cross
People from Greenfield, Indiana
Irish emigrants to the United States (before 1923)
Catholics from Indiana
19th-century American Roman Catholic priests